Rainer Offergeld  (born 26 December 1937) is a German politician. He was minister of Economic Cooperation from 1978 to 1982. Offergeld was mayor of Lörrach from 1984 to 1995.

References

1937 births
Living people
Economic Cooperation ministers of Germany
Members of the Bundestag for Baden-Württemberg
Members of the Bundestag 1983–1987
Members of the Bundestag 1980–1983
Members of the Bundestag 1976–1980
Members of the Bundestag 1972–1976
Members of the Bundestag 1969–1972
Members of the Bundestag for the Social Democratic Party of Germany